Bala Gazaf Rud (also Romanized as Bālā Gazāf Rūd; also known as Gazāf Rūd) is a village in Bibalan Rural District, Kelachay District, Rudsar County, Gilan Province, Iran. At the 2006 census, its population was 614, in 176 families.

References 

Populated places in Rudsar County